Following is a list of flights of the Douglas X-3 Stiletto, the American experimental aircraft that first flew in October 1952 and retired in 1956.

X-3 pilots

X-3 flights

Flight lists